Néville is a commune in the Seine-Maritime department in the Normandy region in northern France.

Geography

Heraldry

Population

Places of interest
 The church of St.Martin, dating from the thirteenth century.
 Vestiges of a feudal castle.
 The sixteenth century chapel of Saint-Jean-Baptiste at Pleine-Sévette.

See also
Communes of the Seine-Maritime department

References

Communes of Seine-Maritime